The 1980–81 Magyar Kupa (English: Hungarian Cup) was the 41st season of Hungary's annual knock-out cup football competition.

Semi-finals
Diósgyöri VTK               -  Újpest Dózsa Budapest       =  2 - 1 (1-1)
Vasas SC Budapest           -  Budapesti-Honvéd            =  2 - 1 (2-1)

Final

See also
 1980–81 Nemzeti Bajnokság I

References

External links
 Official site 
 soccerway.com

1980–81 in Hungarian football
1980–81 domestic association football cups
1980-81